Lt. Gen. Elias Waya Nyipuoch is a South Sudanese was born in 1958 in Luo land, Bahr el-Gazal Region, he holds a Master's Degree in Military Strategy from Khartoum High Academy Military Sciences (1992) in Sudan. He obtained his Sudan School Certificate in 1977 and joined University of Cairo, Khartoum Branch, between 1977 and 1979. Also he joined Sudan Military College and was awarded Diploma in Military Science in 1981. He took many professional military courses in the Sudan (1984 –1991), the United Kingdom (2007), the USA (2004) and in Switzerland (2005), among others. He is currently an enrolled student of Political Science in University of Juba.
Lt. Gen. Elias Waya had enjoyed many successful assignments in the Sudan Armed Forces (SAF) after his graduation from Sudan Military College. He was deployed between1981 to 1985 to Eastern Command, Kassala and Gadaraf, from where he was shortly assigned to Kapoeta Garrison in 1983. Also he was deployed to Northern Command, 3rd Division in Shendi (1985 – 1992) where he was transferred to Nasir Garrison Command between 1986 and 1989.

Lt. Gen. Elias Waya joined SPLA with the rank of Major (Psc) in June 1992 after having mutinied against the Sudan Armed Forces with his Southern Sudanese colleagues. He became one of the key SPLA field commanders of the Operation Jungle Storm in 1992, including being assigned as operational commander against the break-away forces of Kerbino Kuanyin Bol’s in 1994. He was assigned to be the SPLA Commander of Juba South Kit, Agooro and Kerpet between 1996 and 1997. He was member of SPLA Operation Thunder Bolt (OTB) between 1997 and 2000, a special operation group under direct command of Dr. John Garang. Further, he was assigned in 2001 as operation commander against Marahilin (Arabs nomads) who were used by Sudan Armed Forces against the SPLA and citizens of Southern Sudan. He became overall Commander of SPLA in Bahr el Ghazal in 2005 and then transferred to Khartoum to become the Chairman of Technical Committee of Joint Defence Board in Khartoum between 2005 and 2009. He was then transferred to Juba to become the Director for Organization in SPLA/GHQRs between 2009 and 2010, Director for Officers Affairs in SPLA/GHQs between 2010 and 2011, and Director for General Training in SPLA/GHQs between 2011 and 2012.

Lt. Gen. Elias Waya Nyipuoch was put on SPL Reserved List in 2013 and Promoted to Lt. General in 2015 in the Non-Active List of SPLA Commanders. He was the Governor of Wau State, South Sudan from 24 December 2015 until 25 June 2016. He was the first governor of the state, which was created by President Salva Kiir on 2 October 2015.

In late June 2016, insecurity in Wau increased dramatically, as unidentified gunmen emerged who  attacked positions in and outside the state. A state of emergency was declared in Wau, as the Sudan People's Liberation Army (SPLA) moved in to prevent a further escalation of violence. Waya himself claimed to support the emergency declaration, stating " All who are here are rebels, so the Division [5 of the] SPLA is ready and even those who are just walking around are ready". On 24 June 2016, President Kiir unexpectedly sacked Nyipuoc, and just a few hours later, had him arrested. A local SPLA commander declared that Waya had been arrested because he was responsible for the deteriorating situation in the state, claiming that he had no respect for the military and talked "nonsense". Shortly thereafter, the situation escalated completely, as a heavy battle broke out in Wau town, the state's capital. By late 25 June, the army claimed to have secured the town and searched for hiding insurgents.

Three days later, however, Wau town was attacked by a major force of insurgence, reportedly 700 fighters, under the "command of [a] dissident South Sudanese politician and joined by other Sudanese militias". Government officials claimed that most assailants belonged to the "Islamic Movement for Liberation of Raja".

References

Living people
South Sudanese politicians
Year of birth missing (living people)